Oracle SQL Developer is an Integrated development environment (IDE) for working with SQL in Oracle databases. Oracle Corporation  provides this product free; it uses the Java Development Kit.

Features 
Oracle SQL Developer supports Oracle products. In the past a variety of third-party plugins was supported which users were able to deploy to connect to non-Oracle databases.  Oracle SQL Developer worked with IBM Db2, Microsoft Access, Microsoft SQL Server, MySQL, Sybase Adaptive Server, Amazon Redshift and Teradata databases.

Oracle SQL Developer supports automatic tabs, code insight, bracket matching and syntax coloring for PL/SQL.

Components 

Oracle SQL Developer product components include the OWA (Oracle Web Agent or MOD_PLSQL), an extension module for the Apache web server, and helps in setting up dynamic web-pages from PL/SQL within Oracle SQL Developer.

Extensions 

In addition to the extensions provided by Oracle, third parties have written extensions to add new features to SQL Developer and to integrate with other products:

 New features
 GeoRaptor, Geospatial data viewer
 Insider, Collect statistics for a single Oracle instance and display in real time
 Schema Visualizer allows you to create fully featured Entity Relationship Diagrams (ERD)

 Integration with other Oracle products
 SQL Developer Data Modeler operates with and models metadata. Prior to SQL Developer version 3, it constituted a separate (but integrated) free counterpart of SQL Developer. As of SQL Developer version 3 modeling became an integrated part of the overall tool. "Data Modeler" can produce (among other outputs)  files.

Integration with other commercial products
 Red Gate - Deployment Suite for Oracle (Compares schemas and data; deploys all changes.)
 JDBCWizard (produces Java Web Service code to run your existing PL/SQL and SQL statements)
 Method R Trace (zero-click trace file collector)
 Digger (trace analyzer)
 SVCO Extension (integrated version-control for Oracle database server schema objects)

History

See also 
 JDeveloper
 Oracle Developer Suite

References

Bibliography

External links 
 

Database administration tools
SQL clients
PL/SQL editors
Oracle software
Oracle database tools
Microsoft database software
Sybase
2006 software